Irving "Mickey" Freeman (February 12, 1917 – September 21, 2010) was an American actor and comedian. He was best known for playing Private Fielding Zimmerman in the American sitcom television series The Phil Silvers Show.

Freeman guest-starred in television programs, including Naked City, The Equalizer and The Lloyd Bridges Show. He also made two appearances on The Ed Sullivan Show. He had been a member of the New York Friars Club since January 1987. Freeman died in September 2010 at New York City, New York, at the age of 93.

Filmography

Film

Television

References

External links 

1917 births
2010 deaths
People from New York (state)
American male television actors
Male actors from New York City
20th-century American male actors